Ole Tholstrup (1930-1990) was a wealthy Danish industrialist with interests in the Kosan a/s conglomerate. 

Tholstrup was the son of the industrialist Knud Tholstrup, who founded Kosan a/s, and his wife Eva Helen Brødsgård. 

Ole Tholstrup died from alcoholism in 1990.

References

Further reading
Tholstrup, Knud. (2015) Erindringer: Erhvervsmand, politiker, debattør. Allerød: Fritanken. 

Danish industrialists
1930 births
1990 deaths

Knud Tholstrup